The 2016 Ohio State Buckeyes football team represented Ohio State University in the 2016 NCAA Division I FBS football season. It was the Buckeyes' 127th overall, the 104th as a member of the Big Ten Conference, and third as a member of the Eastern Division. The team was led by Urban Meyer, in his fifth year as head coach, and played its home games at Ohio Stadium in Columbus, Ohio.

Ohio State was the preseason favorite to win the Big Ten, and were ranked sixth in the preseason AP Poll. They began the year with six straight victories, including on the road against then-No. 14 Oklahoma and in double overtime against then-No. 8 Wisconsin, and rose to second in the AP Poll. However, the next week they suffered their first loss at Penn State in a White Out game at Beaver Stadium. The team won its remaining regular season games, and finished conference play with an overtime victory against third-ranked Michigan. Penn State and Ohio State both finished with conference records of 8–1, and Penn State advanced to the 2016 Big Ten Football Championship Game due to the head-to-head victory. Despite this, and Penn State's victory over Wisconsin in that game, Ohio State was ranked ahead of Penn State at third in the final College Football Playoff rankings, earning them a spot in the national semi-final Fiesta Bowl against second-ranked Clemson. The Buckeyes were shutout in that game 31–0 and ended the year at 11–2.

The Buckeyes were led on offense by quarterback J. T. Barrett, who finished with 2,555 passing yards and 24 touchdowns. Running back Mike Weber led the team with 1,096 rushing yards and nine touchdowns. Center Pat Elflein was named a unanimous first-team All-American and was the recipient of the Rimington Trophy as the nation's top center. On defense, cornerback Malik Hooker led the Big Ten with seven interceptions (three returned for a touchdown) and was also a unanimous first-team All-American.

Offseason

Players lost 
 QB Cardale Jones – drafted by the Buffalo Bills in  Round 4 of the 2016 NFL Draft with the 139th overall pick
 RB Ezekiel Elliott – drafted by the Dallas Cowboys in Round 1 of the 2016 NFL Draft with the 4th overall pick
 WR Jalin Marshall – undrafted, signed with the New York Jets
 WR Michael Thomas – drafted by the New Orleans Saints in Round 2 of the 2016 NFL Draft with the 47th overall pick
 WR Braxton Miller – drafted by the Houston Texans in Round 3 of the 2016 NFL Draft with the 85th overall pick
 TE Nick Vannett – drafted by the Seattle Seahawks in Round 3 of the 2016 NFL Draft with the 94th overall pick
 OT Taylor Decker – drafted by the Detroit Lions in Round 1 of the 2016 NFL Draft with the 16th overall pick
 OL Chase Farris – undrafted, signed with the Detroit Lions
 DE Joey Bosa – drafted by the San Diego Chargers in Round 1 of the 2016 NFL Draft with the 3rd overall pick
 DT Adolphus Washington – drafted by the Buffalo Bills in Round 3 of the 2016 NFL Draft with the 80th overall pick 
 LB Darron Lee – drafted by the New York Jets  in Round 1 of the 2016 NFL Draft with the 20th overall pick
 LB Joshua Perry – drafted by the San Diego Chargers in Round 4 of the 2016 NFL Draft with the 102nd overall pick 
 CB Eli Apple – drafted by the New York Giants in Round 1 of the 2016 NFL Draft with the 10th overall pick 
 S  Tyvis Powell – undrafted, signed with the Seattle Seahawks
 S  Vonn Bell – drafted by the New Orleans Saints in Round 2 of the 2016 NFL Draft with the 61st overall pick

Schedule

Sources:
Sources:
‡Ohio Stadium attendance record

Roster

Depth chart

Rankings

Game summaries

Bowling Green

Sources:

The Ohio State Buckeyes defeated the Bowling Green Falcons by a score of 77–10 at Ohio Stadium in Columbus, Ohio. Ohio State's offense started off slow by QB, J. T. Barrett throwing an interception returned for a touchdown to Brandon Harris. Ohio State then went on to score 21 unanswered points before BGSU made a field goal midway through the second quarter. Ohio State scored two more times and led at halftime 35–10. The Buckeyes went on to score six more touchdowns in the second half and allowing no scoring.

Ohio State's offense gained 776 yards, which broke the record of most yards in a game held since 1930, and scored ten touchdowns. The Ohio State defense, commonly known as the Silver Bullets, allowed 244 yards and scored a defensive touchdown. Ohio State's J. T. Barrett set a record for the most touchdowns in a game with seven and tied the single-game record of six passing touchdowns. For his performance Barrett was named Big Ten Offensive Player of the Week.

Game Statistics

Game Leaders

Tulsa

Ohio State (1–0) took on the Tulsa Golden Hurricane (1–0) and won by a final of 48–3 in Columbus, Ohio. Following the kickoff by Ohio State, Dane Evans' pass was intercepted by Ohio State's Marshon Lattimore during the first offensive possession of the game. Ohio State was unable to find their way into the endzone and settled for a 29-yard Tyler Durbin field goal to make the score 3–0. Tulsa and Ohio State went on to trade field goals to make it 6–3, Ohio State. The OSU defense then forced turnovers on the next three Tulsa possessions, scoring two defensive touchdowns, to end the half up 20–3.

There was a weather delay of 50 minutes at halftime due to lightning strikes in the general vicinity of the stadium.

The Buckeyes scored to open the second half on a 9-play, 72-yard drive, capped by an 11-yard touchdown run by J. T. Barrett. The OSU offense went on to add three more touchdowns. The Silver Bullet defense of Ohio State forced two second-half turnovers and allowed no offensive points from the Golden Hurricane.

Game Statistics

Game Leaders

at Oklahoma

After kickoff was delayed from the original start time of 7:30 P.M. due to lightning and thunderstorms in the vicinity of the University of Oklahoma, the Buckeyes (2–0) and Sooners (1–1) began play at 9:00 P.M. in Norman, Oklahoma. Ohio State struck first, midway through the first quarter on a Curtis Samuel 36-yard touchdown run. On Oklahoma's next possession, Ohio State's Jerome Baker intercepted Baker Mayfield's pass to score a touchdown on a 68-yard interception return. This was Ohio State's fourth defensive score in their first three games. During the ensuing kickoff, Oklahoma's Joe Mixon returned the kick for a 97-yard touchdown, to make the score 14–7, Ohio State. Though not caught, Mixon dropped the ball before he crossed the goal line and fumbled into the end zone. Ohio State scored another two touchdowns and Oklahoma made a field goal to make the score 28–10. With six minutes to go in the half, Oklahoma scored on a 35-yard Mayfield pass to A.D. Miller to give the OSU defense their first allowed offensive touchdown of the year and brought the Sooners within 11. The Buckeye offense drove 75 yards to end the first half on a behind-the-back grab by Noah Brown to give the Buckeyes a 35–17 halftime advantage.

Ohio State scored on their opening possession of the half with Noah Brown's school record tying fourth touchdown reception. Oklahoma scored again with four minutes to go in the third quarter to make the score 42–24, Ohio State. The final score of the game was a 31-yard Tyler Durbin field goal with 10:33 to go making the final 45–24.

Noah Brown was named Big Ten Offensive Player of the Week and Jerome Baker was named conference co-Defensive Player of the Week for their performances.

Baker Mayfield (the Sooners starting QB) claimed that the Ohio State team and fans who traveled to Norman sang their fight song after their win. Baker Mayfield cites this as his reasoning for spiking the flag on the Ohio State symbol at the 50 yard line in the 2017 rematch in Columbus.

Game Statistics

Game Leaders

Rutgers

The Ohio State Buckeyes (4–0, 1–0) played the Rutgers Scarlet Knights (2–3, 0–2) in Columbus, Ohio on Oct. 1, 2016. The Buckeyes won by a score of 58–0. Ohio State allowed only 121 total yards (33 passing, 83 rushing) and gained 669 (259 passing, 410 rushing.) This was their largest regular season conference shut out since 1981 and their first since 2013. Ohio State's J. T. Barrett, set the Ohio State record for most career passing touchdowns with 59.

Mike Weber was named the conference's Freshman player of the week for his performance in the game. He rushed for 144 yards and one touchdown on 14 carries and caught one pass for three yards.

Former head coach Earle Bruce dotted the "i" in Script Ohio prior to the game.

Game Statistics 

Game Leaders

Indiana

Ohio State (5–0, 2–0) defeated Indiana (3–2, 2–1) by a score of 38–17. This Buckeye victory extended the longest current Big Ten win streak against a single opponent to 21, with the Hoosiers' last win over the Buckeyes coming in 1988.

The Indiana secondary held the Buckeye pass offense to only 93 yards passing, but allowed 290 yards and four touchdowns on the ground. This included a career-high of 26 careers for J. T. Barrett. The Buckeye defense forced two turnovers and allowed only 99 yards rushing on 40 attempts.

Game Statistics

Game Leaders

at Wisconsin

    
    
    
    
    
    
    
    
    
    

The #2 Ohio State Buckeyes (6–0, 3–0) defeated the #8 Wisconsin Badgers (4–2, 1–2) in overtime, in a cross-divisional Big Ten match up on Oct. 15, at Camp Randall Stadium, by a score of 30–23. With both teams ranked in the top ten of both major college football polls, ESPN had chosen Madison, Wisconsin as the host of College GameDay. This was Wisconsin's second appearance on GameDay for 2016 and Ohio State's first. Ohio State extended their current win streak over the Badgers to five, dating back to 2011. Ohio State coach Urban Meyer is 4–0 versus Wisconsin and this was Badgers' coach Paul Chryst's first game against the Buckeyes.

The Buckeyes started the game off slow by gaining only 23 yards on their first two drives, both resulting in punts, while allowing 147 yards for the Badger's offense on their first two drives that resulted in a ten-point lead for #8 Wisconsin. Neither team could find the endzone for the remainder of the first half and both settled for two additional field goals apiece for a halftime score of 16–6 favoring the Badgers.

The Silver Bullet Buckeye defense came out strong in the second half forcing two Wisconsin turnovers and a three-and-out, on Wisconsin's first three possessions. Though the Buckeyes threw an interception on their first possession, they followed it up with two consecutive touchdowns, both J. T. Barrett runs. On Barrett's second touchdown, Ohio State took their first lead of the night at the 14:09 mark of the fourth quarter, and the Buckeyes led 20–16. The next drive, Wisconsin drove 81 yards to take back the lead with 7:54 left in the game. The Buckeyes followed that score with a field goal to tie the game at 23 with 3:57 to go. The Badger offense drove 25 yards on their last possession, but come up short of field goal range and had to punt to the Buckeyes with 0:14 left. The Buckeyes with the ball on their 17-yard line decided to run out the clock and force overtime.

Ohio State would get the ball first in overtime and would score a touchdown on a J. T. Barrett pass to Noah Brown on third and two from the Wisconsin 7, which gave them a 30–23 lead. On Wisconsin's attempt, quarterback Alex Hornibrook would throw a 21-yard pass on Wisconsin's second play which got the Badgers to the Ohio State 4. After two Corey Clement runs for no gain and an incomplete pass, the game came down to a fourth and goal from the Ohio State four. Wisconsin opted for a pass and Hornibrook was sacked by Tyquan Lewis to preserve Ohio State's unbeaten status.

The Buckeyes were led by Barrett who had 226 yards passing and 92 yards rushing and three total touchdowns (two rushing, one passing). Barrett was named Big Ten Co-Offensive Player of the Week for his 318 total yard performance. He was also named  Davey O’Brien National Quarterback of the Week. Wisconsin's quarterback Alex Hornibrook had 214 yards passing and one touchdown and running back Corey Clement gained 164 yards on 25 carries against the Buckeyes. Wisconsin Junior Linebacker Jack Cichy, who had 15 tackles, one sack and a forced fumble, was named Big Ten Defensive Player of the Week for his performance.

Ohio State stayed at #2 in both the AP and Coaches Polls and Wisconsin dropped two spots to #10 in the AP Poll and remained unchanged at #10 in the Coaches Poll. The Badgers would be the highest rated two-loss team.

Game Statistics 

Game Leaders

at Penn State

Despite being 20-point favorites, the #2 Ohio State Buckeyes (6–1, 3–1) lost to their inter-divisional rival, the Penn State Nittany Lions (5–2, 3–1), at Beaver Stadium in University Park, Pennsylvania on October 22, at 8 p.m. on ABC. After the Ohio State special teams blocked a field goal on Penn State's opening drive, the Buckeyes score 12 unanswered points through two field goals and a J. T. Barrett to Marcus Baugh touchdown. Penn State finished the first half on a 20-yard touchdown pass with only nine seconds remaining in the first half, to give the Buckeyes a 12–7 lead at the half.

Ohio State scored a 74-yard Curtis Samuel Rushing touchdown on their second possession of the third quarter and followed it up with a safety when Penn State's punt team fumbled the ball into the endzone. Ohio State would not score anymore following that touchdown. Penn State went on to score a touchdown and also a field goal following a blocked punt. Making the score 21–17, Ohio State. With 4:27 left in the game, Ohio State ran out their field goal team to attempt a 43-yard field goal to go up by seven, but the kick was blocked and returned 60 yards to give Penn State a 24–21 lead which was also the final score.

This was Urban Meyer's first loss to Penn State, making him 4–1 versus the Nittany Lions.

Game Statistics 

Game Leaders

Northwestern

   
   
   
   
   
   
   

The #6 Ohio State Buckeyes (7–1, 4–1) defeated the Northwestern Wildcats (4–4, 3–2) on October 29, in a cross-divisional match up by a score of 24–20. This was the first meeting for the teams since 2013 and the first meeting in Columbus since 2007. Ohio State extended their win streak over Northwestern to six, dating back to 2004.

The Buckeyes started off the game quickly by scoring ten unanswered points in the first quarter with a Mike Weber touchdown run and a 35-yard Tyler Durbin field goal following an Ohio State interception. The Wildcats inched closer by scoring at the 14:51 mark of the second quarter, but it was followed by another Weber touchdown run of 23 yards. With 1:23 left in the half, Northwestern made a 23-yard field goal to make the halftime score 17–10, Ohio State.

Northwestern kept the Buckeye offense in check during the third quarter allowing no scoring and their offense tied the game at 17 with 3:49 to go in the third quarter. Ohio State found the endzone once more with 9:43 to go on a Curtis Samuel 3-yard run giving the Buckeyes a 24–17 lead. The final score came on a 33-yard Northwestern field goal with 3:31 to go in the game.

Game Statistics 

Game Leaders

Nebraska

    
    
    
    
    
    
    
    
    
    

The #6 Ohio State Buckeyes (8–1, 5–1) defeated  #9 Nebraska Cornhuskers (7–2, 4–2) at Ohio Stadium in front of the second largest crowd in Ohio Stadium history. This was the first match-up since 2012 and only the second since Nebraska joined the Big Ten Conference in 2011. Urban Meyer is 2–0 versus the Cornhuskers, winning the 2012 clash by a score of 63–38. Ohio State opened as 18-point favorites.

On Nebraska's first drive quarterback Tommy Armstrong Jr. threw an interception to Damon Webb, who returned the interception for a touchdown to give the Buckeyes an early 7–0 lead. The ensuing possession for the Cornhuskers would be a 15-play, 72-yard drive that would result in a 20-yard field goal, Nebraska's only points of the game. Ohio State would score three more touchdowns and a field goal in the first half to give the Buckeyes a 31–3 lead. With 6:03 left in the second quarter, Tommy Armstrong Jr. ran for 11-yards but was hit while going out-of-bounds causing him to hit his head and briefly knocked unconscious. He was carried off of the field on a stretcher and transported to Ohio State University Wexner Medical Center for evaluation. He was quickly released and made an appearance back in the stadium in the third quarter to chants of "Tommy! Tommy!" from the Ohio State student section.

Ohio State would receive the ball in the third quarter and would score on the opening play with a 75-yard pass from J. T. Barrett to Curtis Samuel. Ohio State's offense would score 17 more points in the game and defensive back Malik Hooker would record his second interception returned for a touchdown and fifth overall for the season. The Cornhuskers failed to stop the Buckeyes from scoring on all of their drives.

Curtis Samuel was named Big Ten Conference Co-Offensive Player of the Week for his performance by gaining 173 all-purpose yards and two touchdowns.

at Maryland

    
    
    
    
    
    
    
    
    
    

The #6 Ohio State Buckeyes (9–1, 6–1) defeated the Maryland Terrapins (5–5, 2–5) 62–3 in a Big Ten East match-up. The game was played on Nov. 12, at 3:30 pm, in College Park, Maryland and was aired on ESPN. It was the third meeting between the teams with the Buckeyes being victorious in both previous games. The Buckeyes came in as 28-point favorites.

Ohio State came out of the gates quickly by scoring touchdowns on their first two offensive possessions while holding the Terrapins to −4 yards. Maryland mustered up a 23-yard field goal at the 2:03 mark of the first quarter and would not score the rest of the game. The Buckeyes would go on to score on five of their last six possessions of the first half and forcing two Maryland turnovers to close the half up 45–3.

The Buckeyes scored two more touchdowns and a field goal in the second half, while Maryland would not reach the Buckeye-side of the field.

Following a chaotic week in football, the Buckeyes would jump to #2 in both the AP and Coaches Polls following their second straight 59-point victory.

 

Statistics

at Michigan State

    
    
    
    
    

The No. 2 Ohio State Buckeyes (10–1, 7–1) defeated the Michigan State Spartans (3–8, 1–7), 17–16, in East Lansing, Michigan.

Michigan State received the opening kickoff and in two plays scored a 64-yard touchdown screen pass from Tyler O'Connor to L. J. Scott to give the Spartans a 7–0 advantage 46 seconds into the game. Following Ohio State and Michigan State trading punts, Ohio State evened the score on a 5-play, 50-yard drive, capped by a 24-yard J. T. Barrett pass to Curtis Samuel.

The Spartans opened the second quarter with a 28-yard field goal to give them a 3-point lead, but were tied once again by the Buckeyes on the following drive with a 39-yard field goal. Ohio State intercepted an O'Connor pass two plays later and drove the ball into the redzone. On third and three at the MSU 16, Mike Weber fumbled the ball giving Ohio State no chance to attempt a field goal. Ohio State and Michigan State went into halftime tied at ten.

Both teams punted twice to start the second half until Ohio State formed a four-play 69-yard drive that resulted in another touchdown, giving them a 17–10 advantage. The next score came from Michigan State on a 1-yard L. J. Scott run. The Spartans opted to go for a two-point conversion with only 4:41 left in the game to attempt to take the lead. Tyler O'Connor's pass was intercepted in the end zone and the Buckeyes maintained the lead, 17–16. Ohio State got the ball back and ran 2:37 off the clock on six plays, but punted with 2:04 left in the game. Tyler O'Connor was sacked on the first play by Tyquan Lewis for a loss of ten yards, the following play, Gareon Conley intercepted O'Connor's pass to seal the Buckeyes' 17–16 victory.

Mike Weber was named Big Ten Freshman of the Week for his performance and for the second time this season.

Statistics

Michigan

    
    
    
    
    
    
    
    

Following its road game against Michigan State, Ohio State faced its arch-rivals, the Michigan Wolverines, in the 113th meeting of "The Game". In the previous meeting, Ohio State defeated Michigan for the fourth consecutive year, winning 42–13.

In this year's game, the #2 Ohio State Buckeyes (11–1, 8–1) defeated the #3 Michigan Wolverines (10–2, 7–2) by a score of 30–27 in double overtime. After neither team scored in the first quarter, Michigan opened the scoring in the second quarter via a 28-yard field goal from Kenny Allen. Ohio State responded with a 16-yard interception return from Malik Hooker. Michigan closed the scoring in the first half via a one-yard touchdown run from Khalid Hill, which made the score 10–7 in favor of Michigan at halftime. Michigan extended their lead in the third quarter via an eight-yard touchdown pass from Wilton Speight to Hill. Ohio State reduced Michigan's lead to three points via a one-yard touchdown run from Mike Weber, before Tyler Durbin recorded a 23-yard field goal as time expired in the fourth quarter to tie the game and force overtime. In overtime, Ohio State scored via a seven-yard touchdown run from J. T. Barrett. Michigan responded with a five-yard touchdown pass from Speight to Amara Darboh to force double overtime. In double overtime, Michigan scored via a 37-yard field goal from Allen. On a controversial 4th and 1 play, J.T Barrett ran up the middle and was tackled in such a way that the forward progress made it difficult to determine where the ball would be spotted. The result was ultimately that the officials gave Ohio State the first down. The next play, Curtis Samuel recorded a 15-yard touchdown run to win the game.

Dave Adolph served as honorary captain for both Michigan and Ohio State. The game marked the 11th time that Michigan and Ohio State took the field both in the nation's top-five rankings; and is just the second time that both programs were ranked in the nation's top three. The other was the No. 1 vs. No. 2 matchup in 2006 at Ohio Stadium. The game also marked the first overtime in the Michigan-Ohio State rivalry. Michigan's defense recorded a season-best eight sacks against Ohio State. It is the program's most since posting nine against Notre Dame on September 15, 2007. The Wolverines have recorded at least three sacks in each of the last four games. Wide receiver Amara Darboh surpassed the 2,000-yard receiving milestone in the contest. Darboh caught eight passes for 68 receiving yards, upping his career total to 2,026. Darboh has recorded a reception in 32 consecutive games, earning a share of the fourth spot among Michigan's all-time leaders in the category. He is tied with Marquise Walker (1998–2001).

Raekwon McMillan was named the conference Defensive Player of the Week for his performance. He recorded a career-tying 16 tackles, including seven solo stops.

Statistics

CFP Playoff

Clemson (Fiesta Bowl – CFP Semifinal)

Awards and honors

*The NCAA and Ohio State only recognize the AP, AFCA, FWAA, Sporting News and WCFF All-American teams to determine if a player is a Consensus or Unanimous All-American. To be named a Consensus All-American, a player must be named first team in three polls and to be Unanimous, they must be named first team in all five.

References

Ohio State
Ohio State Buckeyes football seasons
Ohio State Buckeyes football